Matt Martin may refer to:

Matt Martin (racing driver) (born 1991), American racecar driver
Matt Martin (ice hockey, born 1971), American ice hockey player who played for the Toronto Maple Leafs
Matt Martin (British politician) (born 1971), British politician
Matt Martin (ice hockey, born 1989), Canadian ice hockey winger who plays for the New York Islanders
Matt Martin (baseball), American baseball coach
Matthew Martin (lawyer) (born 1979), United States Attorney for the United States District Court for the Middle District of North Carolina
Matthew Martin (mariner) (1676-1749) an East India Company mariner and politician
Matthew Martin (merchant) (1748–1838), English merchant, naturalist and philanthropist
Matt Martin (Chicago politician) (born 1984), Illinois politician
Matt Martians (born 1988), stage name of Matthew Martin, American record producer, illustrator, singer, and songwriter